Marcus Dwayne Dixon (born September 16, 1984) is an American football coach and a former defensive end in the National Football League for the Dallas Cowboys and New York Jets of the National Football League (NFL). He is the defensive line coach for the Denver Broncos. Dixon was signed by the Dallas Cowboys as an undrafted free agent in 2008. He played college football at Hampton University.

Dixon is also known for a 2003 court case in which, whilst still at high school, he was convicted of statutory rape and aggravated child molestation. The latter charge was later overturned by the Georgia Supreme Court.

Early years
Dixon attended Pepperell High School, where he competed in football, basketball and track. As a junior, he registered 98 tackles (12 for loss), 3 sacks and 7 passes defensed, receiving first-team All-area honors. He also placed third in the regional shot put and discus.

As a senior, Dixon attempted to play in the season opener with a chip bone in his left knee, but he suffered a setback. On September 17, he underwent knee surgery and was not able to continue playing football during his recovery process.

Dixon was a grade A student and excelled on the football field to the point where he had been offered a full scholarship at Vanderbilt University, which he was unable to undertake due to his subsequent imprisonment.

College career
Upon his release from prison, Dixon accepted a football scholarship from Division I-AA Hampton University in Hampton, Virginia. As a true freshman, he appeared in all 12 games, starting 6 of the last 7 contests. He had 38 tackles (seventh on the team) and 9 tackles for loss (fifth on the team).

As a sophomore, Dixon started 9 out of 10 games, collecting 33 tackles, 2.5 sacks, 7 tackles for loss and one interception.

As a junior, he started in all 11 games playing at defensive end and defensive tackle, while making 25 tackles, 4 sacks (third on the team) and 5.5 tackles for loss.

As a senior, Dixon posted 58 tackles (third on the team), 5 sacks (tied for the team lead), 8 quarterback hurries, 16 tackles for loss (led the team), 2 passes defensed, 2 forced fumbles, one fumble recovery and one block kick. In the season opener against Morgan State University, he tallied 9 tackles (2.5 for loss), one sack and had a 13-yard touchdown reception as a tight end.

In four seasons with the Pirates, Dixon finished with 154 tackles and 11.5 sacks. He was a three-time captain, an All-Mid-Eastern Athletic Conference (MEAC) selection in his last two years and contributed to 3 MEAC championships.

Professional career

Dallas Cowboys
On April 27, 2008, Dixon signed a three-year, $1.1 million deal with the Dallas Cowboys as an undrafted free agent. He was slowed with groin and abdominal injuries, only playing in the last preseason game. He was waived on August 30.

In 2009, Dixon was slowed with a back injury during the preseason. He was released on September 5 and signed to the practice squad on September 7.

In 2010, Dixon saw limited playing time during preseason. He was released on September 4, 2010.

New York Jets
On September 5, 2010, Dixon was claimed off waivers by the New York Jets. He was active in 3 games with one start, making 4 tackles and one sack.

An exclusive rights free agent, Dixon was signed to a one-year contract on January 26, 2011. He appeared in 16 games with 3 starts, posting 16 tackles, 1.5 sacks, one pass defensed, one forced fumble and one fumble recovery during the season.

Dixon was released on September 1, 2012. He was re-signed to the active roster on September 4. He appeared in 3 games, before being released on September 24. In his time with the Jets, he played in 22 games (4 starts), registering 21 tackles, 2.5 sacks, one pass defensed, one forced fumble and one fumble recovery.

Kansas City Chiefs
On February 9, 2013, Dixon was signed by the Kansas City Chiefs. He was cut on August 31.

Tennessee Titans
On January 3, 2014, Dixon was signed to a futures contract with the Tennessee Titans. He was released during final cuts on August 29.

BC Lions (CFL)
On October 20, 2014, Dixon was signed to the BC Lions practice roster in the Canadian Football League. He made his CFL debut in the final game of the regular season against the Calgary Stampeders. He was re-signed on March 2, 2015. He retired on April 30, 2015.

Coaching career

Early Coaching Career
In 2012, he was a volunteer defensive line coach at Shorter University. In 2015, he was offered a Bill Walsh Minority Coaching Fellowship by the Dallas Cowboys from May through the first week of September. In 2016, he was hired as an assistant football coach for the defensive line and tight ends at Darlington School.

Hampton University
In 2017, he was hired as the defensive line assistant football coach at Hampton University. In 2018, he added the role of Director of Player Development. In 2019, he was named the assistant football coach for defensive ends and also served as director of player development and recruiting coordinator.

Rams
The Los Angeles Rams hired Dixon as their assistant defensive line coach on February 23, 2021. Dixon won his first Super Bowl championship when the Rams defeated the Cincinnati Bengals in Super Bowl LVI.

Denver Broncos
On February 18, 2022, Dixon was hired by the Denver Broncos to serve as the team's defensive line coach for the 2022 season.

Personal life

Dixon v. State case
Kristie Brown alleged that on February 10, 2003, Dixon forced her to have sex, taking her virginity. She has stated that contrary to Dixon's supporters' belief, she was never Dixon's girlfriend and although they shared classes, they barely knew each other. The jury acquitted Dixon of rape, battery, assault and false imprisonment, but because Brown was only 15 and Dixon 18 at the time of the incident found him guilty of statutory rape and aggravated child molestation. Because of this Dixon was convicted at the mandatory amount under Georgia law, 10 years imprisonment. If he had been found guilty of rape, he would have faced a much less severe punishment.

Supporters of Dixon including the NAACP and the Rev. Joseph Lowery's People's Agenda alleged the charges were racially motivated.  The President of the Children's Defense Fund, Marian Wright Edelman called it a "Legal Lynching".

Overturned conviction and release
The Georgia Supreme Court overturned Dixon's conviction for child molestation and he was released the same day, on May 3, 2004. The court let his conviction for misdemeanor statutory rape stand. After Dixon's release both he and Brown appeared on The Oprah Winfrey Show in an attempt to clarify their stories.

See also
 Wilson v. State of Georgia

References

Further reading
Arey, Norman.  "Teenager's Appeal to High Court to Attack Sentencing Guidelines." Atlanta Journal-Constitution. January 20, 2004   (p. B1).
Arey, Norman. "Ex-Star Athlete Guilty in Sex Case." Atlanta Journal-Constitution.   May 16, 2003   (p. C4).
Dadigan, Marc. "Dixon Suit Settled for $130,000." Rome News-Tribune.   June 14, 2005.
Edelman, Marian Wright.   "Old South Lingers in a Legal Lynching." Los Angeles Times.   January 22, 2004   (p. B17).
Gregory, Lauren. "Accuser Gets Settlement from System." Rome News-Tribune.   June 11, 2005.
Gregory, Lauren. "Marcus Dixon Movie Possible." Rome News-Tribune.   June 11, 2005.
Jacobs, Andrew.   "Student Sex Case in Georgia Stirs Claims of Old South Justice."  New York Times.   January 22, 2004
Milloy, Courtland.   "Marcus Dixon Doesn't Belong In Ga. Prison." Washington Post.   January 25, 2004   (p. C1).
Wooten, Jim.   "Home Life, Not Racism, the Problem." Atlanta Journal-Constitution.   January 27, 2004   (p. A9).
Associated Press. "Floyd County Schools Ask Federal Court to Throw Out Lawsuit in School Statutory Rape Case." September 12, 2003.
Associated Press. "Georgia High Court Overturns Teen's Sentence for Having Sex with Minor." CNN.com May 3, 2004.

External links
Hampton Pirates bio 
Draft prospect determined to address doubts about his character
Official Website
BC Lions bio

1984 births
Living people
Sportspeople from Rome, Georgia
Players of American football from Georgia (U.S. state)
American football defensive ends
Canadian football defensive linemen
African-American players of American football
African-American players of Canadian football
Hampton Pirates football players
Dallas Cowboys players
New York Jets players
Kansas City Chiefs players
Los Angeles Rams coaches
Tennessee Titans players
High school football coaches in Georgia (U.S. state)
Hampton Pirates football coaches
Overturned convictions in the United States
21st-century African-American sportspeople
20th-century African-American people
Denver Broncos coaches